Nyksund is a coastal fishing village on the northern part of the island of Langøya in the Vesterålen archipelago. It is part of the municipality of Øksnes in Nordland county, Norway.

History
 People have been living in Nyksund since before recorded history. Until the late 18th century, the population was scarce, but with the rise of commercial trade, Nyksund became an important centre for hundreds of fishermen coming to exploit the rich cod fisheries nearby.

As bigger vessels and road transportation rendered the port obsolete due to its shallow waters and poor road, Nyksund became an isolated outpost with a dwindling population. Finally, measures were made to shut the place down. During the 1970s, the city became a ghost town.

With the turn of the 21st century, after 30 years of erosion, the lights were turned back on in Nyksund. New citizens found the old houses worthwhile. In 2003, the main obstacle to new activity in Nyksund was inadequate infrastructure—be it roads, postal service, or utility services. Modern Nyksund boasts a summer population of 30 to 40 people and about a half-dozen hardy souls remain throughout the harsh winters.

References

External links
https://web.archive.org/web/20100626065417/http://nyksund.no/
http://www.nyksund.com
Nyksund pictures

Øksnes
Villages in Nordland
Populated places of Arctic Norway
Fishing communities